Hoku Ho Clements (born June 10, 1981) is an American singer and actress. She is known for her 2000 hit single "Another Dumb Blonde" from the soundtrack and film Snow Day and the song "Perfect Day" from the soundtrack and film Legally Blonde.

Early life
Hoku was born Hoku Christian Ho on June 10, 1981, on the island of Oahu, part of the Hawaiian Islands, the daughter of entertainer Don Ho and Patricia Swallie. Her given name, Hoku, is the Hawaiian word for star. Her father was hapa, of Native Hawaiian, Chinese, Portuguese, German, and Dutch descent. She has one full sibling, a younger sister named Kaimana, and eight half-siblings. For a time, Clements lived in an affluent Hawaiian neighborhood, Diamond Head, with Don, Patricia, Kaimana, Don's ex-girlfriend Elizabeth Guevara, and Don and Elizabeth's two daughters.

Hoku frequently performed with her father, who taught her how to write songs, as a child. She was initially unaware of her father's fame, learning from people's reactions after realizing who her father was. "I thought everyone's parents had shows at night," she said. She graduated from La Pietra.

Career
Hoku credits her father for her discovery. "People helped me a lot, because of who my dad was," she said. She caught the attention of songwriter and producer Antonina Armato, who encouraged her to move to Los Angeles to meet with other producers. "She has a pure voice," Armato said. "I don't have to doctor it and use all the tricks of the studio." Hoku was attending Point Loma Nazarene University in San Diego, dropping her last name when she moved from Hawaii, when she was offered a $300,000 contract from Geffen Records. Armato assisted Hoku in securing the deal, and Ho insisted that he and his lawyers review it before she signed. "I didn't want her signing something that wasn't good," he said.

Hoku's debut single, "Another Dumb Blonde" (the theme song to the 2000 film Snow Day), was released on January 18, 2000. A day after its music video premiered on MTV, it was the network's tenth most-requested video. The song was a top ten sales hit in the United States and peaked at number 27 on the Billboard Hot 100, additionally charting at number 47 in New Zealand. Shocked by the single's success, Hoku dropped out of Point Loma Nazarene and began recording her first album Hoku (2000). The album was released on April 18, 2000, by Geffen and Interscope Records and peaked at number 151 on the Billboard 200.

Hoku planned to work on a second album for Interscope after the March 2001 release of her single "Perfect Day". Struggling to find a niche in the pop music industry, she left the label, disagreeing with them regarding her image and marketing, which she felt clashed with her Pentecostal Christian upbringing. She wrote and funded an EP, Listen Up, which was released on August 1, 2008, through the singer's own Ola Vista Records. She opened for Gwen Stefani's Neal S. Blaisdell Center shows of The Sweet Escape Tour later that month. In March 2018, she decided to return to her music and release an EP titled Called by Name. Unlike her previous works, this is her first Christian EP.

Musical style and artistry
Jason Lynch of People has called bubblegum pop Hoku's speciality. Hoku's AllMusic page lists her musical styles as teen pop and Europop. She has been frequently compared to fellow pop singers Christina Aguilera and Britney Spears, however, Charlotte Dillon of AllMusic has noted Hoku's distinct style, attributing it to the singer's Christian faith. "It's not very comfortable for me to be a sex symbol, especially because of my faith," Hoku has said. "That's why I enjoy being involved with the younger kids, because they relate to me being the girl next door." In his review of Hoku, Stephen Thomas Erlewine wrote, "Sure, it's commercial – that's what teen pop is all about – but never once do the record makers decide to push Hoku as a nymphet. Her songs are never sexual the way those of Britney Spears and Christina Aguilera surely are." Erlewine also noted that her young-sounding voice made it appropriate that her music was "targeted toward middle-school daydreams and junior-high dances".

Personal life
Hoku became a Christian after first attending church in 1995  and she has said nothing means more to her than music outside of her family and faith. She married her high school sweetheart, Jeremy Clements, in 1999. The couple eloped "for personal reasons", according to Hoku, later saying that she was scared to tell her father because of his harsh attitude towards boys she previously dated and how young she was at the time.  Hoku and her husband Jeremy have three children and serve as Arts and Worship Architects at Branches Church in Dana Point, California.

Discography

Studio albums

EPs

Singles

Music videos
"Another Dumb Blonde" (2000)
"How Do I Feel" (2000)
"Perfect Day" (2001)

Filmography

Film

Television

References

External links
 Official website
 Hoku at IMDb

1981 births
Living people
20th-century American women singers
21st-century American women singers
American women pop singers
American film actresses
American musicians of Chinese descent
American musicians of Portuguese descent
American Pentecostals
American people of English descent
American people of German descent
American people of Native Hawaiian descent
American soul singers
Christians from Hawaii
Hawaii people of Chinese descent
Hawaii people of Portuguese descent
People from Oahu
Point Loma Nazarene University alumni
Singers from Hawaii
20th-century American singers
21st-century American singers